Skeleton Coast is a 1987 South African made mercenary war film directed by John Cardos in the first of three films for producer Harry Alan Towers. It was the first of Towers' Breton Film Productions.

Plot
During the Angolan Civil War CIA agent Michael Smith is working with UNITA rebels. He is captured by the Angolan Armed Forces and sent to a prison to be interrogated by an East German named Major Schneider. Smith's father, retired US Marine Corps Colonel Bill Smith has no faith in the United States Government freeing his son. The Colonel travels to South West Africa where he pays the mysterious Elia for accurate information about his son's location of captivity. Colonel Smith hires seven mercenaries that he will lead into Angola to rescue his son.

Captain Simpson, the leader of a security force of a diamond mine has a man keeping his eye on the Colonel fearing that he may be a diamond smuggler. Elia's wife Opal is carrying on an illicit relationship with Simpson and informs him that the Colonel murdered his security man, in reality he was murdered by Rick Weston, the leader of Smith's private army. Rick informed the Colonel he was an Angolan secret agent. Elia then discovered that either Col. Smith paid him in counterfeit money or the money was replaced with counterfeit money in his safe. Entering Angola, the mercenaries team up with Sekassi, the Jonas Savimbi type leader of the rebels to support their rescue of Michael Smith.

Cast
Ernest Borgnine as	Col. Bill Smith
Robert Vaughn as Maj. Schneider
Oliver Reed as Capt. David Simpson
Herbert Lom as Elia
Daniel Greene as Rick Weston
Leon Isaac Kennedy as Chuck
 Nancy Mulford as Sam
 Peter Kwong as Tohsiro
 Robin Townsend as Opal
 Simon Sabela as Sekassi
Arnold Vosloo as Blade
Tullio Moneta as Armando
Larry Taylor as Robbins
 Jonathan Rands as Michael Smith

Production
Nadia Caillou, the daughter of screenwriter and author of the Private Army of Colonel Tobin series of novels Alan Caillou made her screenwriting debut in the film. She had acted in John Cardos's 1977 film Kingdom of the Spiders.  Cardos claimed Harry Alan Towers reedited the film that destroyed the continuity of the story.

Tullio Moneta was second-in-command to Mike Hoare when the latter led the 1981 Seychelles coup d'état attempt at Mahe Airport in the Seychelles and was sentenced to five years in prison in November 1981.

Arnold Vosloo married his co-star Nancy Mulford.

See also
 Uncommon Valor

Notes

External links

1987 films
1987 action thriller films
War adventure films
Films set in Angola
Films shot in South Africa
Films about mercenaries
Films shot in Namibia
Counterfeit money in film
1980s English-language films
English-language South African films
South African action thriller films